KRBM (90.9 FM) is a radio station licensed to Pendleton, Oregon. The station is owned by Oregon Public Broadcasting, and airs OPBs news and talk programming, consisting of syndicated programming from NPR, APM and PRI, as well as locally produced offerings.

KRBM roots began when Blaine Hanks was recruited by Blue Mountain Community College in 1968 to start a 2-year radio broadcasting program. On April 18, 1970 KRBM (FM) signed on the air with broadcast students operating the station and Blaine Hanks as general manager. The calls letters stood for Radio Blue Mountain. The original power was 10 watts and was mono. The station only operated during the school year. Over the years, power was increased and by 1984 had a mono signal of 440 watts effected radiated power. The broadcast antenna was located above the station on Morrow Hall. It still only broadcast during the school year, Monday through Saturday from 12:00 PM to Midnight with a top 40 format. In 1981 the station developed a partnership with Oregon Public Broadcasting and began broadcasting OPB Monday through Friday from 10:00 am to 12:00 pm. At noon, the students would take over local broadcasts till midnight with a top 40 format. In 1984, OPB invested in the radio station with a new control board and transmitter exciter converting the station from a mono to stereo signal. In June 1987 OPB moved the KRBM transmitter from the college to Warren Hill and increased power to 25 kW, covering a large portion of Eastern Oregon. OPB programs also took over most of the schedule, leaving only Friday and Saturday evenings for local broadcasting for the students. The power increase led to a merger with OPB. By 1988, OPB assumed all of the programming and Blue Mountain Community College ended the broadcasting program. Blaine Hanks remained the general manager through the entire history at BMCC. The studios were eventually removed from the college and OPB partnered with KUMA to maintain the operations in Pendleton.

References

External links
opb.org

RBM (FM)
RBM
NPR member stations
Pendleton, Oregon